Amorphophallus commutatus, or dragon stalk yam (Marathi- , ; Hindi- ), is a plant species in the family Araceae. Amorphophallus is a large genus of some 170 tropical and subtropical tuberous herbaceous plants, which includes the world's largest flower, titan arum.

References

commutatus
Plants described in 1879